Algee Smith IV (born November 7, 1994) is an American actor and singer. After appearing in several small television roles, Smith first rose to fame portraying Ralph Tresvant in BET's The New Edition Story miniseries. The same year, he garnered critical acclaim as Larry Reed in Kathryn Bigelow's film Detroit. He is also known for his role as football player Christopher "Chris" McKay in 
the HBO drama series Euphoria.

Early life 
Smith was born in Saginaw, Michigan. At the age of eight, he and his family moved from Michigan to Atlanta where he started his acting career. Having a musician for a father and a fashion designer for a mother, Smith was well immersed in the arts and also completed his first rap recording at the age of 9. During this time, he attained several minor television roles; those of which he credits for "perfecting his craft." Smith was home schooled for high school. He left Atlanta, GA and moved to Los Angeles at the age of 20.

Career 
After appearances in projects such as Disney Channel's Let It Shine and Earth to Echo, Smith landed his first major acting role playing real-life singer Ralph Tresvant in The New Edition Story, which also showcased his singing and dancing abilities. Smith also starred in Kathryn Bigelow's film Detroit, which tells the story of the Algiers Motel incident. His performance was praised by critics and he received a nomination for Outstanding Actor in a Motion Picture at the 2018 NAACP Image Awards. He also performed a song for the Detroit film soundtrack, called "Grow." On June 22, 2017, Smith released his first EP entitled Listen, featuring a blend of R&B and Hip hop tracks. In 2018, he co-starred with Amandla Stenberg in The Hate U Give, a film adaptation of the young adult novel of the same name. Smith also reprised his role as Ralph Tresvant in BET's The Bobby Brown Story. In 2019, he earned a starring role as Chris McKay in the highly acclaimed TV series Euphoria. Smith returned to film in 2021, portraying Jake Winters in the film Judas and the Black Messiah, which details the work and ultimate assassination of Black Panther Party activist Fred Hampton. He also appeared and portrayed one of the main roles, Sam, in the film Mother/Android.

Filmography

Film

Television

Discography

EPs

Mixtapes

References

External links 
 

American male television actors
1994 births
People from Saginaw, Michigan
Living people
Male actors from Michigan
Male actors from Atlanta
21st-century American male actors
American male film actors
African-American actors